Christine O'Neil (born 19 March 1956) is an Australian former professional tennis player.

O'Neil is best known for her singles victory at the 1978 Australian Open, and was the last Australian to win the title until Ashleigh Barty in 2022. She also became the first unseeded woman to win the title in the Open era. O'Neil is also one of the few players who have won both the Australian Open junior (1973) and senior (1978) titles.

In 2007, along with her brothers Keith and William, O'Neil took over the Morisset Sports & Tennis Centre located in Newcastle, New South Wales. The centre was subsequently renamed the O'Neil School of Tennis. She then moved on to operate O'Neil's School of Tennis in Cessnock, New South Wales. She has since moved to Port Macquarie and currently coaches.

Grand Slam finals

Singles (1 title)

Grand Slam tournament performance timeline

Singles

Note: The Australian Open was held twice in 1977, in January and December.

References

External links
 
 
 

Australian female tennis players
Australian Open (tennis) champions
Australian Open (tennis) junior champions
Tennis people from New South Wales
1956 births
Living people
Sportswomen from New South Wales
Sportspeople from Newcastle, New South Wales
Grand Slam (tennis) champions in women's singles
Grand Slam (tennis) champions in girls' singles
20th-century Australian women